Yeats College is the brand name of two private, co-educational day schools in Ireland, one on College Road in Galway, founded in 1992, and one on Parnell Street in Waterford, founded in 1999.  They offer the final two years of the Irish secondary school programme, as well as short courses.

In 2004, the schools announced a programme that would allow 20 of its students from each to obtain medical and dental degrees from Charles University in Prague, Czech Republic.

Results
In the class of 2010, 21 students received an offer for medicine on first round offers. 
In the class of 2011, 32% scored higher than 500 points in the Leaving Certificate.
In the class of 2012, 43% scored over 500 points and 19% achieved 550 points or over.
In contrast, in the class of 2022, 62% scored over 500 points and 45% achieved 550 points or over.

References

External links

Private schools in the Republic of Ireland
Grind schools in Ireland
Education in Galway (city)
Secondary schools in County Galway
Buildings and structures in Galway (city)
1992 establishments in Ireland
Educational institutions established in 1992
Secondary schools in County Waterford
1999 establishments in Ireland